Girls' Generation Tour is the second concert tour by South Korean girl group Girls' Generation. The concert tour kicked off in Seoul and continued in Taipei and Singapore. Girls' Generation performed their first ever concert in Hong Kong on January 15, 2012.

Background
The tour was announced by SM Entertainment in June 2011. The tickets for the tour went on sale on June 7, 2011, on Gmarket. The concert takes approximately three hours. The Singapore concert production cost S$1.8 million said by the organizers Running Into The Sun (RITS) and Conceptual. The concert will feature the standard massive LED screens and lasers as well as new elements like trapezes and two custom-built stages with three walkways between them.

Concerts
The Seoul concert was attended by Super Junior, f(x), A Pink, 4MEN, Davichi's Kang Minkyung, as well as Kim Soo-hyun, Kim Ah-joong, Jung Ryeo-won, Park Min-young, Im Soo-hyang, Jung Joon-ho and Shin Se-kyung.

On July 24, 2011, Sooyoung announced that the next concert will be held in Taipei City, the capital city of Taiwan. They also became the first foreign girl group to hold 3 days concert on Taipei Arena and drew 31,000 audiences.

On October 11, 2011, it was announced that the next concert will be held on December 9, 2011, in Singapore. Due to overwhelming response regarding lack of tickets, it was announced on October 30, 2011, that there will be a second concert on the following day after the first night, on December 10, 2011, in Singapore.
The concert was also held on January 15, 2012, in Hong Kong.
And most recently, it was confirmed that Girls' Generation will perform a concert on February 12, 2012, in Bangkok, Thailand.

On January 14, Girls’ Generation broke the record for the fastest concert to sell out in Thailand. The highest priced tickets sold out in ten minutes. All 11,000 concert tickets were sold in twenty minutes, setting the record for the concert to be sold out the fastest in Thailand.

Members of Girls' Generation announced to the fans in Thailand that Bangkok leg would be their last stop for their 2nd Asia Tour.

Set list

Tour dates

DVD and Blu-ray

Girls' Generation Tour (DVD)

Girls' Generation Tour  is the seventh music DVD release video from South Korean girl group Girls' Generation. It was released on November 30, 2012, in South Korea.

The DVD features footage from the concert tour's start in Seoul, South Korea on July 23 and 24. It consist of two discs showing nearly all of the performances during the concert, a bonus film of the making of the concert, performances from Japan, personal interviews with the members of Girls’ Generation, and waiting room and rehearsal footage. A photobook and a first press limited edition poster will also be included with the DVD.

Track list
Disc 1:
 Intro
 소원을 말해봐 (Genie)
 you-aholic
 MR.TAXI (Korean ver.)
 I'm In Love With The HERO
 Let It Rain (Korean ver.)
 Member Introductions
 첫눈에... (Snowy Wish)
 뻔&Fun (Sweet Talking Baby)
 Kissing you
 Oh!
 Don't Stop the Music [Hyoyeon]
 Almost [Jessica]
 Three [Sunny]
 Lady Marmalade [Taeyeon, Tiffany]
 THE GREAT ESCAPE
 BAD GIRL
 Devil's Cry (Run Devil Run Intro)
 Run Devil Run
 Beautiful Stranger
 훗 (HOOT)
 If [Yuri]
 Sway [Sooyoung]

Disc 2:
 Danny Boy
 Complete
 동화 (My child)
 냉면 (차가운 니 얼굴) [Cold Noodles] {Ice Boy}
 HaHaHa Song
 Gee
 Member Talk
 영원히 너와 꿈꾸고 싶다 (Forever)
 다시 만난 세계 (Into the new world)
 힘 내! (Way To Go)
 Member Talk
 It's Fantastic
 Closing Comments

Release history

External links
 Girls' Generation ― it's the girls' time!, Korea Times
 Girls' Generation's Singapore Concert Brought Forward to December 2011, kourier
 Girls’ Generation Concludes 2nd Asia Tour with Concert in Bangkok, soshified

References

Girls' Generation concert tours
2011 concert tours
2012 concert tours